Palaemon serenus, commonly known as the red-handed shrimp, rockpool shrimp, or rock-pool prawn, is a species of marine shrimp in the family Palaemonidae native to southern and eastern Australia. They are omnivores, feeding on algae or scavenging for animal matter.

Description 

The second pair of legs are elongated, with small white claws and a bright red band near the claws. Females are larger than males and carry eggs under the abdomen.

Distribution and habitat 

Palaemon serenus can be found in the coastal waters of southern and eastern Australia, including New South Wales, Queensland, Victoria, South Australia, Tasmania, and Western Australia. They can also be found in high salinity zones within estuaries.

References 

crustaceans described in 1862
Palaemonidae